Year 1017 (MXVII) was a common year starting on Tuesday (link will display the full calendar) of the Julian calendar.

Events 
 Europe 
 Summer – Melus of Bari, a Lombard nobleman, revolts and is supported by Norman mercenaries at Capua. He marches into Apulia to catch the Byzantine army off-guard. Melus defeats the Byzantines on the banks of the Fortore River and ravages the territory in Apulia.
 Winter – Emperor Basil II ("the Bulgar Slayer") replaces Leo Tornikios with the new catapan Basil Boioannes and sends him reinforcements (including a detachment of the elite Varangian Guard) from Constantinople.

 England 
 January 6 – Cnut ("the Great") is crowned king of England. In July he marries Emma of Normandy, the widow of Æthelred the Unready, securing his ties with Normandy.
 Cnut divides England into four earldoms: Wessex, Mercia, East Anglia and Northumbria.

 Arabian Empire 
 Summer – Hamza ibn-'Ali ibn-Ahmad publicly declares the founding of the Druze religion, during the reign of the Fatimid Caliph Al-Hakim bi-Amr Allah.

 Africa 
 The Sunnis of Kairouan (modern Tunisia) revolt against the Shi'ite Zirid dynasty. The city is quickly retaken and sacked.

 Asia 
 March – Fujiwara no Michinaga passes the title of regent of Japan (Sesshō) to his eldest son Fujiwara no Yorimichi.
 September
 Prince Atsuakira of Japan, eldest son of ex-Emperor Sanjō, having been struck by a skin disease and under intense pressure from Michinaga, resigns the title of Crown Prince in favour of his younger brother, Prince Atsunaga who marries Fujiwara no Kanshi, daughter of Michinaga.
 Michinaga makes a pilgrimage to the Iwashimizu Shrine in Japan accompanied by many courtiers. The travelers divide themselves amongst 15 boats for a floating trip down the Yotogawa River. One of the vessels overturns and more than 30 people lose their lives.
 December 24 – Michinaga is granted the honorary title Daijō-daijin of Japan.
 Rajendra I, ruler of the Chola dynasty (in modern India), conquers Sri Lanka and annexes the island.

 By topic 
 Religion 
 Construction of Saint Sophia Cathedral, Kyiv is started (approximate date).

Births 
 October 28 – Henry III, Holy Roman Emperor (d. 1056) 
 Ahimaaz ben Paltiel, Italian-Jewish liturgical poet (d. 1060)
 Bermudo III (or Vermudo), king of León (approximate date)
 Floris I, count of Friesland west of the Vlie (approximate date)
 Ramanuja, Indian Sri Vaishnavism philosopher (d. 1137)
 Vikramabahu (Kassapa VI), king of Sri Lanka (d. 1041)
 Zhou Dunyi, Chinese philosopher and cosmologist (d. 1073)

Deaths 
 February 5 – Sancho García, count of Castile
 June 5 – Sanjō, ex-emperor of Japan (b. 976)
 June 22 – Leo Passianos, Byzantine general
 July 6 – Genshin, Japanese Tendai scholar (b. 942)
 September 18 – Henry of Schweinfurt, German nobleman 
 October 6 – Wang Dan, Chinese Grand Chancellor
 Eadric Streona, ealdorman of Mercia
 Eadwig Ætheling, son of Æthelred II
 Elvira of Castile, queen consort of León
 Emnilda, duchess consort of Poland 
 Fujiwara no Junshi, Japanese empress (b. 957)
 Judith of Brittany, duchess of Normandy (b. 982)
 Ma'mun II, Ma'munid ruler of Khwarezm
 Ramon Borrell, count of Barcelona (b. 972)
 Renaud of Vendôme, French nobleman

References

Sources